Ice hockey at the 2011 Winter Universiade was held from January 27 through February 6 at the Erzurum GSIM Ice Arena complex in Erzurum, generally called "3000 Ice Rink" and "500 Ice Rink" during Universiade in reference to the seating capacities of its two sheets of ice. In most cases, men's matches were played at 3000 Ice Rink and women's matches were played at 500 Ice Rink, although exceptions were made for the women's semifinals and medal games played in the larger rink, while some lower men's placement games were played in the smaller one. The selection of participating teams – 12 in the men's tournament and six in the women's tournament, including the hosting Turkey sides in both cases – was announced on August 27, 2010, while the draw to place the teams into their assigned pools took place on October 2, 2010.

Venue

Men

Preliminary round
Twelve participating teams were placed in the following three groups. After playing a round-robin, the top two teams in each group, plus the top two third-place teams, advanced to the quarterfinals.

Teams received 3 points for a regulation win, 2 points for an overtime/shootout win and 1 point for an overtime/shootout loss. They were seeded for the playoffs based first on placement within their pool, then by point total, then by fewest goals against.

All game box scores via fisu.net.

Group A 

All times are local (UTC+2).

Group B 

All times are local (UTC+2).

Group C 

All times are local (UTC+2).

9th–12th placement round
All times are local (UTC+2).

11th place match

9th place match

Playoff round

All times are local (UTC+2).

Quarterfinals

5th–8th placement matches

7th place match

5th place match

Semifinals

Bronze medal match

Gold medal match

Final standings

Scoring leaders
List shows the top skaters sorted by points, then goals.

GP = Games played; G = Goals; A = Assists; Pts = Points; +/− = Plus/minus; PIM = Penalties in minutes; POS = Position
Source: fisu.net

Leading goaltenders
Only the top seven goaltenders, based on save percentage, who have played at least 40% of their team's minutes, are included in this list.

TOI = Time on Ice (minutes:seconds); SA = Shots against; GA = Goals against; GAA = Goals against average; Sv% = Save percentage; SO = Shutouts
Source: fisu.net

Women

Preliminary round
Six participating teams were placed into a single group. After playing a round-robin, the teams ranked first through fourth advanced to the semifinals.

Teams received 3 points for a regulation win, 2 points for an overtime/shootout win and 1 point for an overtime/shootout loss.

All game box scores via fisu.net.

All times are local (UTC+2).

Playoff round 

All times are local (UTC+2).

Semifinals

5th place match

Bronze medal match

Gold medal match

Final standings

Scoring leaders
List shows the top skaters sorted by points, then goals.

GP = Games played; G = Goals; A = Assists; Pts = Points; +/− = Plus/minus; PIM = Penalties in minutes; POS = Position
Source: fisu.net

Leading goaltenders
Only the top seven goaltenders, based on save percentage, who have played at least 40% of their team's minutes, are included in this list.

TOI = Time on Ice (minutes:seconds); SA = Shots against; GA = Goals against; GAA = Goals against average; Sv% = Save percentage; SO = Shutouts
Source: fisu.net

Medalists

Medal table

References 

2011 Winter Universiade
Universiade, 2011
2011 Winter Universiade
2011
World